The 2015–16 Korfbal League & Hoofdklasse promotion/relegation play-off was played between AW.DTV (number 9 of the Korfbal League) and TOP (the loser of the Hoofdklasse promotion final). The first match in the play-off was played at the home accommodation of AW.DTV called Gaasperdam. After a 13-10 half-time score the home team won 24-21.

Teams

A total of 2 teams will be taking part in the play-off.

Play-off

References

Korfball in the Netherlands